= Mahyār the Jeweller =

Mahyar the Jeweler is a minor character in Ferdowsi's Shahnameh, appearing in stories related to the reign of Bahram Gur. He is described as a wealthy and artistic trader who sells jewels (jewelry making/selling) while also playing the harp and composing poetry. Therefore, he is considered a representative of the urban, affluent, and culture-loving class in the Sasanian world of the Shahnameh. His importance in the narrative is largely due to his daughter "Arzu", as Bahram Gur falls in love with Mahyar after meeting her and takes her as his wife. Ferdowsi does not provide a detailed account of Mahyar's independent life or fate, and his role is mainly that of an intermediary through whom the king's connection with a non-royal, artistic family is established.
